Brenda Joyce Carter (née Canty; born September 10, 1954) is an American politician from Michigan. Carter is a Democratic member of Michigan House of Representatives from District 29.

Early life 
Carter was born on September 10, 1954. Carter's father was John H. Canty. Carter's mother was Mary S. Wallace. Carter is the fifth oldest and she has twelve siblings. Carter attended high school in Detroit, Michigan.

Education 
Carter attended Spring Arbor College,   Michigan State University, and Oakland University.

Career 
Carter was an engineering analyst for GM.
Carter is a former interim assistant to the City Manager of City of Troy in Michigan. In August 2018, Carter defeated Kermit Williams, Chris Jackson, Lone Bowman, Keyon Payton, and Mike Demand, and won the primary election for Michigan House of Representatives for District 29. On November 6, 2018, Carter won the election and became a member of Michigan House of Representatives for District 29.

Personal life 
Carter's husband is Randy Carter, a councilman. They have five children. In 1998, Carter and her family moved to Pontiac, Michigan.

See also 
 2018 Michigan House of Representatives election

References

External links 
 Brenda Carter at housedems.com
 Brenda Carter at ballotpedia.org
 Brenda Carter at milist.org
 2019 WONder Woman award honorees

21st-century American politicians
African-American state legislators in Michigan
Women state legislators in Michigan
Living people
Democratic Party members of the Michigan House of Representatives
African-American women in politics
1954 births
21st-century American women politicians
21st-century African-American women
21st-century African-American politicians
20th-century African-American people
20th-century African-American women